West Blatchington is an area of Hove, in the unparished area of Hove, in the Brighton and Hove district, in the ceremonial county of East Sussex, England.

The area grew rapidly in the inter-war period, but unlike nearby Hangleton it had more infrastructure, with St Peter's Church, a working farm, a windmill and an industrial area grouped around the Goldstone Pumping Station and its workers' cottages.

Blatchington Mill School, formed in 1979 from the Hove County Grammar School, Knoll Boys School and Nevill Secondary School, lies in the centre of West Blatchington.

The area is crossed by the Monarch's Way long-distance footpath, heading towards its terminus at Shoreham-by-Sea.

Civil parish 
In 1951 the parish had a population of 5796. On 1 April 1974 the parish was abolished.

References

Areas of Brighton and Hove
Former civil parishes in East Sussex
Hove